James Barron (1946 – 7 February 2022), known as Séamus Barron, was an Irish hurler who played for club side Rathnure and at inter-county level with the Wexford senior hurling team. He usually lined out as a forward.

Career
Barron first appeared on the inter-county scene as part of the minor hurling team which won Wexford’s first ever Leinster and All-Ireland titles in 1963. He played at full-forward in the All-Ireland final against Limerick, scoring 1–1. Having progressed to under-21 level, Barron lined out in three successive All-Ireland finals. He claimed his sole winners' medal in the grade in 1965 after a defeat of Tipperary. At senior level, Barron made nine appearances on the Wexford team between 1966 and 1970. He earned an All-Ireland medal as an unused substitute in the 1968 All-Ireland final against Tipperary. Barron was a life-long member of the Rathnure club and lined out in the 1972 All-Ireland club final defeat by Blackrock. He served as a selector under Liam Griffin with the Wexford team that won the 1996 All-Ireland Championship.

Personal life and death

Barron established Barron Machinery in 1983. The company initially provided used tractors until it eventually grew into a substantial franchise dealer of big brands. He died on 7 February 2022, at the age of 75.

Honours

Player

Rathnure
Leinster Senior Club Hurling Championship: 1971
Wexford Senior Hurling Championship: 1967, 1971, 1972, 1973, 1984

Wexford
All-Ireland Senior Hurling Championship: 1968
Leinster Senior Hurling Championship: 1968
All-Ireland Under-21 Hurling Championship: 1965
Leinster Under-21 Hurling Championship: 1964, 1965, 1966
All-Ireland Minor Hurling Championship: 1963
Leinster Minor Hurling Championship: 1963

Management

Rathnure
Leinster Senior Club Hurling Championship: 1971, 1986, 1987, 1998
Wexford Senior Hurling Championship: 1986, 1987, 1990, 1998

Wexford
All-Ireland Senior Hurling Championship: 1996
Leinster Senior Hurling Championship: 1996

References

1946 births
2022 deaths
Rathnure hurlers
Wexford inter-county hurlers
Hurling selectors